Diego Nils Ohlsson López (born 12 March 1999) is a Chilean former professional footballer who played as a centre-back for Colo-Colo of the Primera División in Chile.

Career
He made his professional debut playing for Colo-Colo in 2016. In 2019 he was loaned to Deportes La Serena in the Primera B de Chile. After he decided to focus on his studying career.

Honours
Colo-Colo
 Primera División (1): 2017–T
 Copa Chile (1): 2016
 Supercopa de Chile (1): 2017

References

External links
 
 
 Diego Ohlsson at playmakerstats.com (English version of ceroacero.es)
 

1999 births
Living people
People from Santiago
Chilean people of Swedish descent
Chilean footballers
Association football central defenders
Chilean Primera División players
Colo-Colo footballers
Primera B de Chile players
Deportes La Serena footballers
Footballers from Santiago